Erythronium sajanense is a plant endemic to the Krasnoyarsk (Красноярск) region in Siberia.

References

sajanense
Flora of Siberia
Flora of Russia
Plants described in 2011